Aaron Cook (born 6 December 1979 in Caerphilly, Wales) is a Welsh semi-professional footballer who plays for Wessex League Premier Division side Moneyfields. Cook plays as a centre back.

Career
Cook started his career at Portsmouth. He made one appearance, starting in a 1–0 home win over Stockport County on 17 February 1998, before he moved on loan to Crystal Palace.

In November 2008 he joined Newport County from Salisbury City initially on loan.

He was named in the Conference South All Stars team for the 2008–09 season, in June 2009, as voted for by the managers of Conference South teams.

In October 2009 he joined Eastleigh at a time for the Spitfires when Southampton were in negotiations with Eastleigh regarding Aaron Martin's move from the Silverlake Stadium (which went through in early November).

Cook made a positive start in his Eastleigh debut and helped the defence keep a clean sheet against Hampton & Richmond Borough on Tuesday 27 October 2009.

He joined Gosport Borough in July 2010, and was an ever-present in his first season as his new club finished 13th in the Southern League Division One South & West.

International 
Cook is since 2003 member of the Isle of Wight national football team.

References

External links

1979 births
Living people
Footballers from Caerphilly
Welsh footballers
Association football fullbacks
Portsmouth F.C. players
Crystal Palace F.C. players
Havant & Waterlooville F.C. players
Bashley F.C. players
Salisbury City F.C. players
Newport County A.F.C. players
Eastleigh F.C. players
Gosport Borough F.C. players
Bemerton Heath Harlequins F.C. players
Moneyfields F.C. players
English Football League players